Scopula modicaria is a moth of the family Geometridae. It was described by John Henry Leech in 1897. It is found in China, the Russian Far East, Korea and Japan.

References

Moths described in 1897
Moths of Asia
Moths of Korea
Moths of Japan
modicaria
Taxa named by John Henry Leech